Jan Schütte (born 26 June 1957) is a German film director and screenwriter. He has directed twelve films since 1982. His film The Farewell was screened in the Un Certain Regard section at the 2000 Cannes Film Festival. After graduating from high school, he studied literature, philosophy and art history in Tübingen, Zurich and Hamburg. From 1979 he worked as a television reporter for regional TV programs. His first feature film  premiered at the Venice Film Festival in 1987.
Schütte was director of the German Film and Television Academy and is the director of the American Film Institute in Los Angeles.

Schütte lives with his wife Christina Szápáry in Los Angeles and Berlin.

Filmography
 Ugge Bärtle – Bildhauer (1982, documentary)
  (1987) — (screenplay with )
 Verloren in Amerika (1988, documentary)
  (1990) — (screenplay with )
 Nach Patagonien (1991, documentary) — (based on In Patagonia by Bruce Chatwin)
  (1994) — (screenplay with )
 Eine Reise in das Innere von Wien (1995, documentary) — (based on a novel by Gerhard Roth)
 Fat World (1998) — (based on a novel by Helmut Krausser)
 The Farewell (2000) — (film about Bertolt Brecht's last summer)
 Old Love (2001, short) — (based on a short story by Isaac Bashevis Singer)
 SuperTex (2003) — (based on a novel by Leon de Winter)
 Love Comes Lately (2007) — (based on short stories by Isaac Bashevis Singer)

References

External links

1957 births
Living people
Mass media people from Mannheim
Film people from Baden-Württemberg
Members of the Academy of Arts, Berlin
Presidents of the American Film Institute